INS Kalvari (S21) is the first of the six indigenous Scorpène-class submarines currently in service with the Indian Navy. It is a diesel-electric attack submarine which is designed by DCNS (French naval defence and energy company) and was manufactured at Mazagon Dock Limited in Mumbai.

Etymology and motto 
The ship inherits its name from INS Kalvari (S23) which served in the Indian Navy from 1967 to 1996. Kalvari is the Malayalam word for tiger shark, a deep-sea predator in the Indian Ocean. The name symbolizes agility, strength and predatory power. The tiger shark (Galeocerdo Cuvier) is a species of requiem shark which are found in tropical and temperate waters. The ship's motto is "Ever Onward" which represents the submarine's zeal and indomitable spirit.

History and construction 
The submarine was designated as Yard 11875 at Mazagon Dock Limited and construction began on 14 December 2006 with the first cutting of steel. The five separate sections of the submarine were welded together, called "Boot Together", on 30 July 2014. She was undocked to a pontoon from the East Yard dock on 6 April 2015 in the presence of Defence Minister Manohar Parrikar. 

She is the first Indian Naval vessel to be built using a modular approach. After completing the important milestones of vacuum test and battery loading, she was launched at the Naval Dockyard on 27 October 2015 by Ritu Shrawat, wife of then CMD, Rear Admiral R K Shrawat (Retd). She was brought back to Mazagon Dock Limited for completion of the Basin trials and Harbour Acceptance trials phase. After conquering numerous challenges faced during the ‘Setting to Work’ phase and undergoing rigorous Harbour tests & trials to the complete satisfaction of the customer, she commenced sea trials on 1 May 2016. She was expected to be inducted into the Indian Navy fleet in 2012 but this was delayed.

The submarine successfully fired a torpedo and an Exocet SM39 Block 2 anti-ship missile in the Arabian Sea on 2 March 2017 during sea trials. She was delivered to the Indian Navy on 21 September 2017 after successful completion of sea trials. She was commissioned by Prime Minister Narendra Modi on 14 December 2017 at Mazagon Dock Limited. Her commissioning officer is Captain S D Mehendale.

Operational history 
Post 2019 Balakot airstrike conducted by the Indian Air Force, Indian Navy deployed INS Chakra along with INS Kalvari to search for the Pakistani submarine  which was believed to be deployed. 
As per Pakistan Navy, INS Kalvari was detected by its P3C Orion anti-Submarine aircraft, localised and blocked from entering Pakistani waters, while in Pakistani Exclusive Economic Zone, some 86 miles from Gwadar.

See also
List of submarines of the Indian Navy

References

Kalvari-class submarines
Submarines of the Indian Navy
Attack submarines
2015 ships
2015 in India